The Navy Lark is a radio sitcom about life aboard a British Royal Navy frigate named HMS Troutbridge (a play on HMS Troubridge, a Royal Navy destroyer) based in HMNB Portsmouth. In series 1 and 2, the ship and crew were stationed offshore at an unnamed location known simply as "The Island". In series 2 this island was revealed to be owned by Lt. Cdr. Stanton.

The programme was transmitted on the BBC Light Programme and subsequently BBC Radio 2. It was produced by Alastair Scott Johnston. 

Jon Pertwee is frequently quoted as having suggested the idea of a forces comedy based on the Royal Navy, but Alastair Scott Johnston and writer Lawrie Wyman both contemplated an Air Force- and an Army-themed sitcom before going to the BBC with The Navy Lark. Wyman included ideas based on excuses for late return from leave and other misdemeanours from HMS Troubridge bulletins. He worked with George Evans (Pertwee's personal scriptwriter) from quite early on, but Alastair Scott Johnston did not want him named until the 12th series onward. 

For most of its run the show starred Leslie Phillips, Jon Pertwee and Stephen Murray, whose names rotated in order of precedence with each new episode over the entire 15-series run. Stephen Murray's daughter, Amanda Murray, also appeared in a few episodes.

Episodes of The Navy Lark series are still replayed in rotation on BBC Radio 4 Extra.

Plot
Episodes were self-contained, although there was continuity within the series, and sometimes a reference to a previous episode might be made. A normal episode consisted of Sub Lt Phillips, scheming Chief Petty Officer Pertwee, and bemused Lt. Murray trying to get out of trouble they created for themselves without their direct superior, Commander (later Captain) "Thunderguts" Povey finding out. Scenes frequently featured a string of eccentric characters, often played by Ronnie Barker or Jon Pertwee.  Over the course of the programme Lt Murray marries Admiral Ffont-Bittocks' daughter Rita.

The Republic of Potarneyland, a country situated somewhere on the Indian subcontinent, is featured in several episodes. Over the course of the series, it is revealed that Potarneyland had recently been granted independence from Great Britain, and had joined NATO because the Potanis considered it to be a "free gift scheme". During Series 3 of The Navy Lark, a Potarneyland frigate, the Poppadom, appears in several episodes manned by various Potani officers voiced by Michael Bates and Ronnie Barker.

Cast
Dennis Price as Lieutenant Price ("Number One") (Series 1)
Leslie Phillips as Sub-Lieutenant Phillips, Captain McDoom
Jon Pertwee as Chief Petty Officer Pertwee, Commander Weatherby, Vice-Admiral "Burbly" Burwasher, The Master
Stephen Murray as Lieutenant/Lieutenant Commander Murray ("Number One")
Richard Caldicot as Commander/Captain Povey
Ronnie Barker as Able Seaman "Fatso" Johnson, Lieutenant Commander (Archibald) Stanton, Lieutenant Queeg (Series 1, episode 9), Commander Bell, Intelligence
Heather Chasen as WREN Chasen, Mrs. Ramona Povey, Lady Toddhunter-Brown, Rita Murray (née Ffont-Bittocks), Second Officer McCluty, The Mistress
Tenniel Evans as Able Seaman (later Leading Seaman) "Taffy" Goldstein, Admiral Ffont-Bittocks, Ebeneezer Pertwee, Sir Willoughby Toddhunter-Brown
Michael Bates as Able Seaman Ginger, Lieutenant Bates, Rear Admiral Ironbridge, Padre, Captain Ignatius Aloysius Atchison, Flag Lieutenant Claude Dingle
Judy Cornwell as WREN Cornwell (Series 4 only)
Laurie Wyman as Able Seaman (later Inspector) Burt Tiddy, various
April Walker as WREN Barrett (Series 15 only)

Guests:
Jan Waters as WREN Waters (Series 7, episodes 1 and 2)
Derek Francis as Sir Jeremy Crichton Buller (Series 8, episode 10)
Frank Thornton as Henry Pettigrew (Series 8, ep. 10) and standing-in for CPO Pertwee as cousin Nathaniel Pertwee (Series 11, episode 8)
Chic Murray as Lieutenant Queeg (Series 14, episode 5).

Production

The series used accents and characterised voices to supplement the humour, as well as a good deal of innuendo.

The show's theme tune was "Trade Wind Hornpipe" written and performed by Tommy Reilly on a Barry Music compilation of short interlude pieces published in 1958 on BMC118. In one episode, The Return of Sir Frederick Flatley, a brief snippet of the theme tune is heard when Lieutenant Bates tries to connect the ship to a whaling ship by radio and accidentally "connects" to the actual radio. 

The programme was strong on creating identifiable characters; the listener was able to clearly differentiate each person Laurie Wyman created, many of whom acquired enduring catchphrases, most notably from Sub Lieutenant Phillips: "Corrrrr", "Ooh, nasty...", "Oh lumme!", and "Left hand down a bit". "Ev'rybody down!" was a phrase of CPO Pertwee's, necessitated by a string of incomprehensible navigation orders by Phillips, and followed by a sound effect of the ship crashing. Also, whenever Pertwee had a menial job to be done, Able Seaman Johnson was always first in line to do it, inevitably against his will: "You're rotten, you are!". The telephone response from Naval Intelligence (Ronnie Barker), was always an extremely gormless and dimwitted delivery of Ello, Intelligence 'ere" or "This is intelligence speakin.

Other recurring verbal features were the invented words "humgrummit" and "floggle-toggle" which served to cover all manner of unspecified objects ranging from foodstuffs to naval equipment. Unspecified illnesses include "the twingeing screws", an illness to which Pertwee was a martyr, especially when hearing about being under sailing orders. Ronnie Barker's versatile contributions were recognised and Laurie Wyman (later known as Lawrie Wyman) was asked by the producer to write more parts for Barker.

Dennis Price returned for a guest appearance in the fourth series episode A Hole Lieutenant. Other 'guest stars' included April Walker, Norma Ronald and June Whitfield.

Radio spin-offs

The TV Lark
The TV Lark was intended to be a replacement for The Navy Lark starting with what would have been the programme's fifth series. This situation came about due to the head of light entertainment believing that "forces"-based humour had become dated and television was the next "big thing", so Lawrie Wyman was ordered to create a show with the same cast in an independent TV station situation. Alastair Scott Johnston and Wyman tried to stop this but were overruled: hence, the arrival of The TV Lark.

The entire crew had been drummed out of the service and hired by Troutbridge TV Ltd. Janet Brown joined the cast due to the absence of Heather Chasen for this series. However, mainly due to public pressure, the production team of Alastair Scott Johnston and Laurie Wyman managed to revert the show to nautical capers.  Storylines in The TV Lark nudged back to naval origins across the ten episodes until they were finally reunited with Troutbridge, which continued for another six episodes as the fifth series of The Navy Lark.

The Embassy Lark
Also written by Wyman, three series of The Embassy Lark were broadcast from 1966 to 1968. It starred Frank Thornton and Derek Francis.

The show was set in the British Embassy in the fictional country of Tratvia and was concerned with the various (mis)adventures of the British Ambassador Sir Jeremy Crichton-Buller (Francis) and his First Secretary Henry Pettigrew (Thornton) as they tried to keep smooth relations between Tratvia, Whitehall and the other Embassies (China, the USSR and the U.S.). Ronnie Barker, Stephen Murray, Lawrie Wyman and Leslie Phillips reprised their Navy Lark roles in two episodes. Frank Thornton also appeared in character as Sir Henry Pettigrew in one episode of The Navy Lark.

The Big Business Lark
Another Wyman creation, The Big Business Lark was broadcast as one series in 1969.  It starred Jimmy Edwards and Frank Thornton

The show is set in the boardroom of fictional company British United Plastics, and concerns the business machinations of the chairman, Sir Charles Boniface (Edwards), and his son and deputy chairman, Frank Boniface (Thornton).

Adaptations

Film and television
In 1959, a film version was released, also called The Navy Lark.  Written by Laurie Wyman and Sid Colin and directed by Gordon Parry, it stars Cecil Parker, Ronald Shiner, Elvi Hale, Leslie Phillips and Nicholas Phipps. The setting was changed where "The Island" was named Boonsey, a fictional Channel Island. According to Jon Pertwee's co-written memoir, published shortly after his death in 1996, the film was also supposed to star Pertwee and Dennis Price. However, according to Pertwee the film's producer Herbert Wilcox refused to employ Price "because he was gay." Pertwee was among those who objected to Price not being in the film and believed that this contributed to his own replacement in the cast by Shiner. Pertwee noted that the film "bombed" and said audiences did not consider the film to be The Navy Lark due to the absence of himself, Price and Stephen Murray.

Wyman co-wrote with three other writers a television sitcom HMS Paradise (Associated-Rediffusion, 1964–5) set in a naval shore establishment in which Caldicot played Captain Turvey, but only one series was made. The entire series is considered lost.

Radio adaptations
The show was cut from 30 to 27 minutes by BBC Transcription services, then the discs were exported around the world except for South Africa. Springbok Radio broadcast to English speaking listeners from their Durban studios, but because it was a commercial station, the BBC refused to allow the station to re-broadcast the recorded shows. However, the station acquired the scripts from Wyman and edited them to around twenty-five minutes each, to accommodate the commercial breaks. The revised show was recorded by local actors in front of a live audience. All the UK associations were kept for the South African audiences.

Episode guide

References

External links

Navy Lark Episode Guide
The Navy Lark Guide
The Navy Lark at the Old Time Radio network - 23 episodes

1959 radio programme debuts
1977 radio programme endings
BBC Radio comedy programmes
Royal Navy
Military humor
BBC Radio 4 Extra programmes
BBC Light Programme programmes
BBC Radio 2 programmes
BBC Radio 4 programmes